Anna Orlik (born 5 March 1993) is a Belarusian former tennis player.

She has career-high WTA rankings of 585 in singles, achieved on 26 October 2009, and 387 in doubles, reached on 1 March 2010.

Career summary
Orlik began playing on the ITF Circuit in 2007. She did not win a singles title, but she scored a doubles title in 2008 and went on to win three more in 2009. In 2009, she played her first WTA Tour event in Acapulco, falling to Ágnes Szávay in the opening round.

Before competing in the seniors, Orlik achieved a career high of No. 26 in the juniors ranking.

ITF Circuit titles

Doubles: 6

External links
 
 

1993 births
Living people
Belarusian female tennis players
Tennis players from Minsk